Henry of Valois may refer to:

Henry II of France (1519–1559), King of France
Henry III of France (1551–1589), King of France and Poland

See also
Henri Valois (1603–1676), classicist